Infernet was the second and final member of the  of protected cruisers built for the French Navy in the 1890s. The D'Estrées-class cruisers were ordered as part of a construction program directed at strengthening the fleet's cruiser force at a time the country was concerned with the growing naval threat of the Italian and German fleets. The new cruisers were intended to serve overseas in the French colonial empire.

Infernet had a relatively short career. She was completed in 1900, after which she was assigned to the Northern Squadron. In 1901, she was sent to French Madagascar, and two years later, she was transferred to the East Indies, where she remained through 1905. After returning to France, she ran aground off Les Sables-d'Olonne in 1910 and could not be pulled free.

Design

In the 1880s and 1890s, factions in the French Navy's officer corps argued over the types of cruiser that best served France's interests. Some argued for a fleet of small but fast protected cruisers for commerce raiding, another sought ships useful for patrolling the country's colonial possessions, while another preferred vessels more suited to operations with the home fleet of battleships. The two cruisers of the D'Estrées class were ordered under the construction program of 1896 at the behest of the colonialists for use in the French overseas empire.

She displaced . Her crew numbered 235 officers and enlisted men. The ship's propulsion system consisted of a pair of triple-expansion steam engines driving two screw propellers. Steam was provided by eight coal-burning Normand-type water-tube boilers that were ducted into two widely spaced funnels.

The ship was armed with a main battery of two  Modèle 1893 45-caliber guns. They were placed in individual pivot mounts with gun shields, one forward and aft on the centerline. These were supported by a secondary battery of four  guns, which were carried in sponsons. For close-range defense against torpedo boats, she carried eight  3-pounder Hotchkiss guns and two  1-pounder guns.

Service history

Infernet was built at the Forges et Chantiers de la Gironde shipyard; her keel was laid down in December 1896. The ship was launched on 7 September 1899, having already had her propulsion machinery installed, and she was completed in 1900. She was slated to be deployed to the Pacific, where she was to join the protected cruiser  and the transport vessel . The ship was named for Captain Louis-Antoine-Cyprien Infernet, a French naval officer who had seen action at the Battle of Trafalgar in 1805.

By January 1901, Infernet had instead been assigned to the Northern Squadron, which was stationed in Brest, France, though she was not in commission. On 15 March, Infernet was commissioned for a deployment to the East Indies station, where she was to replace the old unprotected cruiser . The unit was stationed in French Madagascar, then a French colony. There, she joined the cruiser . The two ships remained on the station in 1902, along with a pair of smaller vessels. Infernet was transferred to the East Indies in the western Pacific and Indian Oceans in 1903. On 4 to 8 March she visited Kuwait, along with the Russian cruiser , which was carrying the Russian Consul at Bushire (in modern Iran). The Russian Consul met Ibn Saud, the ruler of Najd, who was in Kuwait at the time, and promised him financial assistance and rifles. This caused concern to the British, who considered any foreign interference in the Persian Gulf area 'a very grave menace to British interests.' On 15 March, Infernet, still accompanied by Boyarin, stopped in Muscat to take on coal, and while there, she was visited by Faisal bin Turki, Sultan of Muscat and Oman. The British cruiser  was present at the time, and Infernets captain visited the cruiser. She made another stop in the port on 15 May, where she was again visited by bin Turki. She remained in the region through 1905, along with the gunboat  and a transport aviso.

Infernet returned to home waters sometime thereafter, and was sold to ship breakers by November 1910. On 12 November, the German tugboat Hercule took Infernet under tow from La Rochelle to bring her to the breaker's yard in Stettin, Germany, but four days later, the tow line broke in heavy seas. Infernet drifted aground off Les Sables-d'Olonne on the Atlantic coast of France and Hercule sheltered in that port. Infernet was found to have come to rest on a shoal, but the water was too low to allow her to be refloated; an initial survey noted that the ship's propellers and rudder were damaged in the grounding. Infernet proved to be a total loss.

Notes

References

Further reading
 

Ships built in France
1899 ships
Destrées-class cruisers